Francisco Garaffa or Garraffa (born May 17, 1910, date of death unknown) was an Argentinian international football player. He was born in Avellaneda.

In Argentina, he played with Racing Club de Avellaneda until 1934, when he decided to move abroad to Italy where he signed with the Serie A club A.S. Livorno Calcio where he would play until 1938. Before retiring he also played back with then Serie C clubs U.S. Lecce and Cosenza Calcio 1914.

He also played twice for the Argentina national football team.

Note: Numerous sources claim he played in Red Star Belgrade, however that club was only founded in 1945. So Garraffa either played in some other club named Red Star, or then he played in some other club in Belgrade, Yugoslavia.

References

External sources
 Argentine players in Italy at RSSSF

1910 births
Sportspeople from Avellaneda
Argentine footballers
Argentina international footballers
Argentine expatriate footballers
Racing Club de Avellaneda footballers
U.S. Livorno 1915 players
U.S. Lecce players
Cosenza Calcio 1914 players
Serie A players
Serie B players
Expatriate footballers in Italy
Association football midfielders
Year of death missing
Argentine expatriate sportspeople in Italy